Derreck Robinson (born March 3, 1982) is a former American football defensive end. He was signed by the San Diego Chargers as an undrafted free agent in 2005. He played college football at Iowa.

Robinson has also been a member of the Miami Dolphins, Dallas Cowboys and Cleveland Browns.

References

External links

Dallas Cowboys bio
San Diego Chargers bio

1982 births
Living people
Players of American football from Minnesota
American football defensive tackles
American football defensive ends
Iowa Hawkeyes football players
San Diego Chargers players
Miami Dolphins players
Dallas Cowboys players
Cleveland Browns players